Harold Sidney Crawford (7 October 1887 – 1979) was a Scottish professional footballer who played as a goalkeeper in the Football League for Millwall, Reading and Woolwich Arsenal.

Personal life 
Crawford served as a private in Transport section of the Army Service Corps during the First World War.

Career statistics

References 

Scottish footballers
Reading F.C. players
English Football League players
Association football goalkeepers
Southern Football League players
Arsenal F.C. players
British Army personnel of World War I
1887 births
1979 deaths
Footballers from Dundee
Newcastle United F.C. players
Hebburn Argyle F.C. players
Millwall F.C. players
Workington A.F.C. players
Royal Army Service Corps soldiers